PROARMAS, officially Associação Nacional Movimento Pro Armas (AMPA) is a private voluntary association, non-profit or political and nationwide, with headquarters in the municipality of Campo Grande, State of Mato Grosso do Sul, Brazil, whose main purpose is the promotion of actions aimed at ensuring the right to self-defense.

History
PROARMAS was conceived by lawyer Marcos Zborowski Pollon, as a way of defending the constitutional principles of the right to life and self-defense through the right to keep and bear arms.

Actions
PROARMAS undertakes actions to disseminate and clarify the population in general and the official bodies involved with public security regarding the right to life and legitimate defense through the publication of clarification pamphlets, face-to-face visits to security and law agencies (FPB, FHP, EB, OAB) and shooting sports clubs in each of the Brazilian States.

PROARMAS also acts at the judicial level, for example, entering as amicus curiae in the "Direct Action of unconstitutionality 6,675" against the decrees published by President Jair Bolsonaro that aim to reduce the bureaucracy of procedures for the acquisition, registration, possession and carry of firearms, accessories and ammunition for those citizens duly qualified under current legislation in Brazil.

Manifestation
PROARMAS has stablished July 9th (referring to the Constitutionalist Revolution) as a manifestation day to get together in Brasilia all citizens supporting the right to keep and bear arms, including the possibility of a "Brazilian Second Amendment"; about 10,000 protesters gathered in the first edition in 2020.

See also
 Viva Brazil Movement
 Gun Owners of America
 National Rifle Association of America
 National Association for Gun Rights (USA)
 Jews for the Preservation of Firearms Ownership
 Overview of gun laws by nation

References

External links
 
 Ato pró-armas em Brasília
 Reunião com o Movimento Pró-Armas Brasil
 OAB Rondônia recebe Movimento Pró Armas para tratar de porte para a advocacia
 Presidente da OAB/RN recebe representante nacional do Movimento Pró-Armas
 Diretorias da OAB/MS e CAAMS recebem Presidente Nacional e Diretor-Regional do Movimento Pró-Armas Brasil
 Comitiva Pró-Armas visita Comando da PMRO
 Olyntho coordena reuniões do Movimento Pró Armas com vários órgãos no Tocantins
 Empresário são-carlense participa do “Movimento Pró-Armas” em Brasília

Organisations based in Brazil